Dorin Arcanu (born 29 March 1970) is a Romanian former professional footballer who played as a goalkeeper for teams such as FC Universitatea Craiova, Oțelul Galați, FC Brașov and Politehnica Iași, among others.

Honours
 FC Universitatea Craiova
 Cupa României: 1992–93; Runner-up 1993–94

 Politehnica Iași
 Divizia B: 2003–04

External links
 
 

1970 births
Living people
People from Gorj County
Romanian footballers
Association football goalkeepers
Liga I players
Liga II players
FC Politehnica Timișoara players
FC U Craiova 1948 players
ASC Oțelul Galați players
AFC Rocar București players
FC Brașov (1936) players
FC Politehnica Iași (1945) players